PWHS may refer to:
 Parkway West High School (Ballwin, Missouri), Ballwin, Missouri
 Parkway West High School (Philadelphia, Pennsylvania), Philadelphia, Pennsylvania
 Plymouth-Whitemarsh High School, Plymouth Meeting, Pennsylvania
 Port Washington High School, Port Washington, Wisconsin
 Portsmouth West High School, West Portsmouth, Ohio
 Proviso West High School, Hillside, Illinois